Ján Čapkovič (born 11 January 1948 in Bratislava, Czechoslovakia) is a former Slovak football player.

Club career
He played most of his professional career for Slovan Bratislava, representing the club from 1967–1977. He helped Slovan Bratislava to the 1969 European Cup Winners' Cup Final where he scored one of their goals as they beat Barcelona by a score of 3–2.

International career
Čapkovič represented Czechoslovakia at the 1970 FIFA World Cup in Mexico. In total, he played for Czechoslovakia, for which he played 20 matches and scored 6 goals.

Personal life
His twin brother Jozef was also a successful footballer.

Honours
Slovan Bratislava
 Czechoslovak First League: 1969–70, 1973–74, 1974–75
 Czechoslovak Cup: 1967–68, 1973–74
 UEFA Cup Winners' Cup: 1968–69

References

1948 births
Slovak footballers
Czechoslovak footballers
1970 FIFA World Cup players
Living people
Czechoslovakia international footballers
ŠK Slovan Bratislava players
Slovak twins
Twin sportspeople
Association football forwards
Footballers from Bratislava
FK Inter Bratislava players